Rhynchites auratus, sometimes called the apricot weevil, cherry-fruit weevil, or golden green snout weevil,  is a species of weevil of the family Rhynchitidae.

Description
Adults measure  in body length.
Their bodies are golden-red in color, with their rostrums and legs brown.
Adults feed on the flowers of cherry trees and other trees in the family Rosaceae.
Adult females later bore holes into the fruits of these trees in which they will lay their eggs.
In high densities, they are considered a serious orchard pest, causing damaged fruits to drop off of trees.

References 

Weevils
Beetles described in 1763
Taxa named by Giovanni Antonio Scopoli